The 2007 Cherwell District Council election took place on 3 May 2007 to elect members of Cherwell District Council in Oxfordshire, England. One third of the council was up for election and the Conservative Party stayed in overall control of the council.

In all 16 seats were contested with one Independent candidate, David Chapman, standing in Ambrosden and Chesterton ward after resigning from the Conservative party in protest at plans to build 1,585 houses near Bicester. The results saw the Conservatives strengthen their control of the council going from 39 to 42 seats. They gained three seats from Labour in Banbury Ruscote, Kidlington South and Yarnton, Gosford and Water Eaton wards. Consequently, Labour only managed to hold on to one of their seats in Bicester West. The Conservatives also gained one seat from the Liberal Democrats in The Astons and Heyfords, but lost Bicester South back to them by one vote. The results meant that Labour and the Liberal Democrats only had 4 seats each in opposition on the council.

After the election, the composition of the council was:
Conservative 42
Labour 4
Liberal Democrat 4

Election result

Ward results

References

2007 English local elections
2007
2000s in Oxfordshire